First Presbyterian Church is a historic church in Talladega, Alabama.  It was built in 1860 and was added to the National Register of Historic Places in 1983.

References

Presbyterian churches in Alabama
Churches on the National Register of Historic Places in Alabama
National Register of Historic Places in Talladega County, Alabama
Romanesque Revival church buildings in Alabama
Churches completed in 1860
Churches in Talladega County, Alabama